is a Japanese idol singer, and a former member of the female idol group Shiritsu Ebisu Chugaku.

Discography 
 See Shiritsu Ebisu Chugaku, § "Discography" for releases with Shiritsu Ebisu Chugaku.

Filmography

TV dramas 
 Vampire Heaven (2013, TV Tokyo) — Episodes 2, 6
   (October 29, 2016, TV Tokyo)
Village Vanguard! (2019, TV Nagoya) — Yuki Iwase
Village Vanguard! 2 ~7nin no Osamurai-hen~ — Yuki Iwase

Movies 
  (March 24, 2012, short film)
  (March 8, 2014, Toei) — Shione Natsume
  (2015) — main heroine
Little Subculture Wars ~Village Vanguard no Gyakushū~ (October 23, 2020) — Yuki Iwase

Stages 
 Onmyoji (July 2017) — Mitsumushi 
 (September 2018 – October 2018) — Kaoru Amane
ELF The Musical (November 2020) — Jovie

Bibliography

Photobooks 
  (July 24, 2015, Wani Books)
Dear. (September 5, 2018, Wani Books)

References

External links 
 Hinata Kashiwagi profile on the Stardust Promotion website
 
  — Aika Hirota's video introduction, recorded in 2011 for Kawaii Girl Japan

Shiritsu Ebisu Chugaku members
1999 births
Living people
Japanese women pop singers
Japanese idols
Japanese child singers
Musicians from Saitama Prefecture
Singers from Tokyo
21st-century Japanese singers
21st-century Japanese actresses
21st-century Japanese women singers